Syndrome X may refer to:

 Groups of symptoms, so called as placeholder name, when newly discovered:
 Cardiac syndrome X
 Metabolic syndrome
 Neotenic complex syndrome
 Acute radiation syndrome, upon its recognition in 1945

See also
 Single X, chromosomal disorder AKA Turner syndrome